The City Parks Foundation is the only independent, nonprofit organization to offer programs in parks throughout the five boroughs of New York City. The organization works in over 750 parks citywide, presenting a broad range of free arts, sports, and education programs. Founded in 1989, it is one of the oldest and largest citywide parks organizations in the country.

Programs offered by City Parks Foundation include free performing arts festivals such as Central Park SummerStage and the Charlie Parker Jazz Festival, which take place annually each summer in parks across all five boroughs of New York City.  Sports programs include free instruction for city youth with CityParks Tennis, CityParks Golf, CityParks Track & Field, and the first of its kind, Junior Golf Center located adjacent to the Dyker Beach Public Golf Course in Bay Ridge, Brooklyn, and CityParks Seniors Fitness. 

CityParks Education offers several educational programs turning parks into classrooms, reaching over 7,000 students and community members and 500 teachers each year. Programs include Coastal Classroom, Green Girls, CityParks Productions, Learning Gardens, and Seeds to Trees.

In addition, City Parks Foundation partners with the New York City Department of Parks and Recreation to offer Partnerships for Parks, an organization that supports the activity of over 60,000 volunteers in parks each year.

References

Parks in New York City
Non-profit organizations based in New York City
Organizations established in 1989